Bytom Synagogue or Beuthen Synagogue was a synagogue in Beuthen, in the Prussian Province of Silesia (present-day Bytom, Poland), a border–town between Germany and the Second Polish Republic prior to German invasion of Poland in World War II. After the plebiscite of 1922, the border passed just east of Beuthen, so that neighboring Katowice was in Poland.

History
Beuthen Synagogue was built in 1869 on Friedrich-Wilhelm-Ring (now Plac Grunwaldzki), in place of an older one. The cornerstone was set on May 25, 1868, construction finished on July 2, 1869. Max Kopfstein (1856–1924) from Bad Ems became rabbi and religion teacher there in 1889. Chief Rabbi from 1919, he participated in the negotiations of the Treaty of Versailles as an expert in matters concerning the Jewish population in Upper Silesia.

The synagogue was burned down by Nazi German SS and SA troopers during the Kristallnacht on 9–10 November 1938. On November 7, 1938 Joseph Goebbels had delivered a fiery antisemitic tirade in Beuthen with a call for vengeance against Jews. They were made to stand for hours in front of their burning Moorish synagogue. Beuthen Jewish Community became the first ever Holocaust transport to be gassed inside "Bunker I" at Auschwitz-Birkenau death camp, all murdered on February 15, 1942, at the onset of the Nazi German Holocaust in Poland. 

A memorial plaque at the site was erected on November 9, 2007.

See also
 Beuthen Jewish Community

References

Sources
 Dan Wyman,  Judaica of the 19th & early 20th centuries
 Kristallnacht 
  Synagogue in Beuthen (now Bytom, Poland).

External links 

 Bytom Synagogue at Museum of the History of Polish Jews, Virtual Shtetl

Buildings and structures in Bytom
Synagogues destroyed during Kristallnacht (Germany)
Former Reform synagogues in Poland
Moorish Revival synagogues
Synagogue buildings with domes
Synagogues completed in 1869
19th-century religious buildings and structures in Poland